Events from the year 1738 in Scotland.

Incumbents 

 Secretary of State for Scotland: vacant

Law officers 
 Lord Advocate – Charles Erskine
 Solicitor General for Scotland – William Grant of Prestongrange

Judiciary 
 Lord President of the Court of Session – Lord Culloden
 Lord Justice General – Lord Ilay
 Lord Justice Clerk – Lord Milton

Events 
 22 May – foundation stone of George Watson's College in Edinburgh is laid.
 Anderston Weavers' Society established in Glasgow.

Births 
 19 May – Sir James Grant, 8th Baronet, politician (died 1811)
 12 December (bapt.) – William Cochran, portrait painter (died 1785)
 19 December – James Playfair, minister of religion and scholar (died 1819)
 Alexander Henderson, merchant and politician in Virginia, "father of the American chain store" (died 1815 in the United States)
 Probable date – James Dickson, botanist (died 1822 in London)

Deaths 
 4 January – George Douglas, 13th Earl of Morton, politician (born 1662)
 25 March – Robert Murray, British Army officer and politician (born 1689)

See also 

 Timeline of Scottish history

References 

 
Years of the 18th century in Scotland
Scotland
1730s in Scotland